The Obersee is a natural lake in the extreme southeast Berchtesgadener Land district of the German state of Bavaria, near the Austrian border. All of the lake is within the Berchtesgaden National Park. It is located southeast of the much larger Königssee.

The two lakes are separated through a moraine. A massive rockfall in 1172 is sometimes referred to as the cause of the separation of the two lakes but Obersee was most likely never part of the larger Königssee and always separated. There are no villages near the lake, the only dwelling being the small Fischunkelalm which is only occupied during the summer month.

References

Lakes of Bavaria
Mountain lakes
Berchtesgaden Alps
LObersee
Berchtesgadener Land